Universal Press Syndicate (UPS), a subsidiary of Andrews McMeel Universal, was an independent press syndicate. It distributed lifestyle and opinion columns, comic strips and other content. Popular columns include Dear Abby, Ann Coulter, Roger Ebert and News of the Weird. Founded in 1970, it was merged in July 2009 with Uclick (which published its comics on GoComics) to form Universal Uclick (now known as Andrews McMeel Syndication).

History
Universal Press Syndicate was founded by John McMeel and Jim Andrews in 1970, two graduates of the University of Notre Dame. Their early syndication success came as a result of Andrews reading the Yale Daily News. While clipping a column by a priest, he was distracted by Garry Trudeau's Bull Tales comic strip on the facing page. When Trudeau's Doonesbury debuted as a daily strip in two dozen newspapers on October 26, 1970, it was the first strip from Universal Press Syndicate, and a Sunday strip was launched March 21, 1971. Circulation of Doonesbury eventually expanded to more than 1,400 newspapers internationally.

Strips like Ziggy (launched 1971), Kelly & Duke, (launched 1972), Tank McNamara (launched 1974), Cathy (launched 1976), and For Better or For Worse  (launched 1979) soon followed, and UPS took off.

UPS established Andrews McMeel Publishing in 1973.

In the spring of 1979, Universal Press acquired the existing columns and strips of the Washington Star Syndicate from Time Inc., which had acquired the Star Syndicate in early 1978. As part of the deal, Time Inc. took on a 20% ownership of Universal Press Syndicate; that was later bought back.

At first, ownership of the comic strips was in the hands of both the artist and the syndicate, but beginning in 1990, UPS gave comic strip creators full rights to their respective works. The company also instituted a policy that says any cartoonist who has been with them for five years or more receives four weeks a year of vacation.

In 1996, UPS established Universal New Media to sell digital entertainment content.

In 1997, UPS acquired Chronicle Features, the syndication arm of the San Francisco Chronicle. (It had previously acquired notable Chronicle Features strips The Far Side, Bizarro, and the editorial cartoons of Ted Rall).

Universal New Media was renamed Uclick in 1997. Also in 1997, Jim Andrews and John McMeel formed Andrews McMeel Universal (AMU) to reflect the diversification that had taken place since its founding. Universal Press Syndicate became one of AMU's subdivisions (along with Uclick and Andrews McMeel Publishing).

In 2004, UPS acquired the international syndicate Editors Press Service (founded in 1933) from the Evening Post Publishing Company and renamed it Atlantic Syndication.

In July 2009, UPS merged with Andrews McMeel's digital entertainment company Uclick to form Universal Uclick.

Some syndicated works

Comic strips (selected) 
UPS strips as of the July 2009 merger into Universal Uclick:

 Adam@home
 Argyle Sweater
 Baldo
 Biographic
 Cathy
 Close to Home
 Compu-toon
 Cornered
 Cul de Sac
 Doonesbury
 The Duplex
 The 5th Wave
 FoxTrot
 Fred Basset
 The Fusco Brothers
 Garfield — acquired from United Feature Syndicate in 1993 (launched 1978)
 Heart of the City
 In the Bleachers
 Ink Pen
 La Cucaracha
 Liō
 Maintaining
 Non Sequitur
 Off the Mark
 Overboard
 Pearls Before Swine
 Pooch Café
 Real Life Adventures
 Red and Rover
 Stone Soup
 Tank McNamara
 Tiny Sepuku
 Tom the Dancing Bug
 W. T. Duck
 You Can with Beakman and Jax
 Ziggy

Concluded UPS strips as of July 2009:
 Bizarro (1995–2003) — acquired from Chronicle Features, where it launched in 1985; moved to King Features Syndicate in 2003, where it continues to the present
 The Boondocks (1999–2006)
 Calvin and Hobbes (1985–1995)
 Citizen Dog (1995–2001)
 Cleats (2001–2010)
 Downstown (1974–1986)
 Encyclopedia Brown (1978–1980)
 The Far Side (1985–1995) — acquired from Chronicle Features, where it launched in 1980
 For Better or For Worse (1979–1997, 2004–2008) — moved to United Feature Syndicate from 1997 to 2004
 Geech (1982–2000) — moved to United Feature Syndicate, where it lasted until 2003
 Kelly & Duke (1974–1980)
 Kudzu (1981–2007)
 Lucky Cow (2003–2008)
 Mullets (2003–2005)
 PreTeena (2001–2008)
 Where I'm Coming From (1991–2005)

Editorial cartoonists 
 Bad Reporter by Don Asmussen
 Matt Davies
 Glenn McCoy
 Pat Oliphant
 Ted Rall
 Ben Sargent
 Tom Toles

Columns and columnists
Past and present UPS columns and columnists include:
 Dear Abby
 Ann Coulter
 Roger Ebert
 Focus on the Family
 The Last Word in Astrology
 The Needleworks by Nancy Thomas
 News of the Weird
 Tell Me a Story
 The Vid Kid by Rawson Stovall

Puzzles and games 
 Timothy Parker

References

External links
 Universal Press Syndicate corporate site
 Universal Press Syndicate corporate site (new)

Comic strip syndicates
Publishing companies of the United States
Publishing companies established in 1970